Vitali Vladimirovich Volkov (born 22 March 1981) is a former Russian footballer.

Club career
He finished as top scorer in the UEFA Intertoto Cup 2007.

Career statistics

Notes

References

External links 
 Tom' Tomsk profile 
 

Living people
Footballers from Moscow
1981 births
Russian footballers
Russia youth international footballers
Russia under-21 international footballers
FC Rubin Kazan players
FC Torpedo Moscow players
FC Tom Tomsk players
Russian Premier League players
Kazakhstan Premier League players
FC Volga Nizhny Novgorod players
Russian expatriate footballers
Expatriate footballers in Kazakhstan
FC Tobol players
FC Okzhetpes players
Association football midfielders
FC Aktobe players